The Halifax County Home and Tubercular Hospital is a historic hospital complex and national historic district located near Halifax, Halifax County, North Carolina.   The listing included nine contributing buildings, two contributing sites and one contributing structure including the site of the first (ca. 1845) Halifax County home and cemetery, the 1923 county home, and its neighbor, the county tubercular hospital, completed in 1925.  Other contributing resources are domestic and agricultural outbuildings. The county home was designed by architects Benton & Benton and is a Neoclassical brick building composed of a two-story central pavilion with one-story hyphenated wings.  The tubercular hospital is a one-story brick building with a gable roof.  The hospital closed in 1973. The tubercular hospital has been destroyed.

It was listed on the National Register of Historic Places in 1985.

References

Hospital buildings completed in 1923
Hospital buildings on the National Register of Historic Places in North Carolina
Historic districts on the National Register of Historic Places in North Carolina
Neoclassical architecture in North Carolina
Buildings and structures in Halifax County, North Carolina
Tuberculosis sanatoria in the United States
National Register of Historic Places in Halifax County, North Carolina
1925 establishments in North Carolina